177th meridian may refer to:

177th meridian east, a line of longitude east of the Greenwich Meridian
177th meridian west, a line of longitude west of the Greenwich Meridian